Daibagnyahati Union is a Union Parishad under Morrelganj Upazila of Bagerhat District in the division of Khulna, Bangladesh. It has an area of 54.05 km2 (20.87 sq mi) and a population of 16,790.

References

Unions of Morrelganj Upazila
Unions of Bagerhat District
Unions of Khulna Division